Sindbad Alibaba and Aladdin is a 1965 action Hindi film starring Pradeep Kumar, Helen etc.

Cast 

 Pradeep Kumar as Sindbad
 Agha as Aladdin
 Bhagwan as Aladdin
 S Bannerji 
 Ram Awtar
 Ulhas
 Helen

Soundtrack

References

External links
 

1965 films
1960s Hindi-language films
Films scored by Ravi
Indian fantasy films
Films set in Baghdad
1960s fantasy films